Evans Brima Gbemeh is a Sierra Leonean politician from Kenema District. He was the mayor of Kenema , and he is a member of the opposition Sierra Leone People's Party (SLPP).

External links
https://web.archive.org/web/20100615224937/http://awoko.org/index.php?mact=News,cntnt01,detail,0&cntnt01articleid=164&cntnt01returnid=79

Year of birth missing (living people)
Living people
Sierra Leone People's Party politicians
Mayors of places in Sierra Leone
People from Kenema District